Hungaria or Hungária may refer to: 
Latin for Hungary, a European country
For historical entities (from 895) see: Hungary (disambiguation)
Lady of Hungaria, the national personification of Hungary
Hungaria (Liszt), a symphonic poem by Franz Liszt
Hungaria (train), an express train between Budapest and Berlin
Hungária, a pop-rock music group from Hungary
Hungária körgyűrű, the longest boulevard in Budapest, Hungary
Hungária körút, part of Hungária körgyűrű
MTK Hungária, Hungarian football club
Hungaria, a former New Zealand association football team, now part of Wellington United
434 Hungaria, an asteroid
Hungaria group, a group of asteroids named after 434 Hungaria